Tian Yuan (born January 29, 1993) is a Chinese weightlifter.

External links
the-sports.org

1993 births
Living people
Chinese female weightlifters
Weightlifters at the 2010 Summer Youth Olympics
Weightlifters at the 2014 Asian Games
World Weightlifting Championships medalists
Youth Olympic gold medalists for China
Asian Games competitors for China
21st-century Chinese women